Ilısu is a village in Güzelyurt District of Aksaray Province, Turkey. Its population is 951 (2021). It is situated on the north of the river Melendiz. 

Ilısu is a part of Ihlara Valley, a valley famous for historical ruins. There are historical cave houses a Roman bath and a Roman bridge  as well as geothermal springs in the town.

History 
The village has had the same name since 1919. The municipality status of the town, which became a municipality on 31 December 1987, ended in 2013 when its population fell below 2000 people.

References

Villages in Güzelyurt District, Aksaray